The staged event-driven architecture (SEDA) refers to an approach to software architecture that decomposes a complex, event-driven application into a set of stages connected by queues. It avoids the high overhead associated with thread-based concurrency models (i.e. locking, unlocking, and polling for locks), and decouples event and thread scheduling from application logic. By performing admission control on each event queue, the service can be well-conditioned to load, preventing resources from being overcommitted when demand exceeds service capacity.

SEDA employs dynamic control to automatically tune runtime parameters (such as the scheduling parameters of each stage) as well as to manage load (like performing adaptive load shedding). Decomposing services into a set of stages also enables modularity and code reuse, as well as the development of debugging tools for complex event-driven applications.

See also
Event-driven architecture (EDA)
Service-oriented architecture (SOA)
Pipeline (computing)

References

Bibliography

External links
Apache ServiceMix provides a Java SEDA wrapper, combining it with related message architectures (JMS, JCA & straight-through flow).
JCyclone: Java open source implementation of SEDA
Mule ESB is another open-source Java implementation
SEDA: An Architecture for Highly Concurrent Server Applications describing the PhD thesis by Matt Welsh from Harvard University
A Retrospective on SEDA by Matt Welsh, July 26, 2010

Events (computing)
Software architecture